Christopher Michael Curry (born November 11, 1977) is an American college baseball coach and former catcher. Curry is the head coach of the Little Rock Trojans baseball team.

Amateur career
Curry attended Conway High School in Conway, Arkansas. Curry played for the school's varsity baseball team. The San Francisco Giants selected Curry in the 26th round of the 1996 Major League Baseball draft. He did not sign, and enrolled at Meridian Community College, to play college baseball for the Meridian Eagles baseball team.

As a freshman at Meridian, Curry was drafted by the Detroit Tigers in the 17th round, but he returned for a sophomore season at Meridian. He was again drafted by the Tigers, this time in the 48th round. He instead accepted a scholarship to Mississippi State University to play for the Mississippi State Bulldogs baseball team.

In the 1999 season as a junior, Curry hit .295, 8 home runs, 11 doubles and 51 RBIs.

Professional career
Curry was drafted in the 9th round by the Chicago Cubs in the 1999 Major League Baseball draft.

Curry began his professional career with the Eugene Emeralds of the Class A Northwest League, where he batted .227 with two home runs.

Coaching career
On November 7, 2008, Curry was named a volunteer assistant for the Arkansas Razorbacks baseball team. On July 17, 2010, Curry was introduced as the head coach at Meridian Community College. Curry lead Meridian to a 69–44 record as the head coach. On June 26, 2012, Curry was named the pitching coach at Northwestern State.

After two seasons at Northwestern State, Curry was named the head coach of the Little Rock Trojans baseball program. Curry lead the Trojans to a 26–26 regular season record and a third-place finish in the Sun Belt Conference in 2016, as a result, he was named the Sun Belt Conference Coach of the Year.

Head coaching record

See also
 List of current NCAA Division I baseball coaches

References

External links

Little Rock Trojans bio

Living people
1977 births
Baseball catchers
Meridian Eagles baseball players
Mississippi State Bulldogs baseball players
Eugene Emeralds players
Lansing Lugnuts players
Daytona Cubs players
West Tennessee Diamond Jaxx players
Iowa Cubs players
Norwich Navigators players
Gary SouthShore RailCats players
Hendrix Warriors baseball coaches
Arkansas Tech Wonder Boys baseball coaches
Arkansas Razorbacks baseball coaches
Meridian Eagles baseball coaches
Northwestern State Demons baseball coaches
Little Rock Trojans baseball coaches
Baseball players from Arkansas
Baseball coaches from Arkansas
Sportspeople from Little Rock, Arkansas